Brayan Steven López Ramírez (born 6 June 1990), known as Brayan López or Bryan López, is a footballer who plays for Sporting San José in the Primera División of Costa Rica. López represents the Nicaragua national football team after having previously represented the Costa Rica national football team.

Early life
López was born to a Costa Rican mother and a Nicaraguan father. He played developed in the system of AD Carmelita.

Club career
In 2008, at age 18, he made his debut with AD Carmelita in the Primera División of Costa Rica, scoring 4 goals and adding 6 assists in 49 games over four seasons, featuring mainly in the 2012/13 season, when he made 41 appearances.

In the summer of 2013, he moved to CS Cartaginés on a two-year contract.

In July 2014, he was sent on loan to Belén FC. Upon the conclusion of his loan, he did not return to Cartaginés for their pre-season, as he wished to leave the club. He later returned to Belén on a permanent deal.

In 2017, he moved to Alajuelense, where he stayed for a short spell.

In January 2018, he moved to Pérez Zeledón

Later in 2018, he moved to Santos de Guápiles.

In 2022, he joined Sporting San José.

International career

Costa Rica
In December 2015, López was called up to the Costa Rica national team ahead of a friendly against Nicaragua. In October 2020, López was called up to the national team ahead of friendlies against Panama. He made his debut on October 11 as a substitute.

After being tired of waiting for another Costa Rica call-up, López decided to switch affiliations to Nicaragua, as he had only appeared in friendlies with Costa Rica.

Nicaragua
In November 2021, he was called up to the Nicaragua national team ahead of friendlies against Cuba. However, he was forced to withdraw from the squad after suffering an injury with his club team in a CONCACAF League match against Canadian club Forge FC.

References

External links

1990 births
Living people
Costa Rican people of Nicaraguan descent
Costa Rican men's footballers
Costa Rican expatriate footballers
Nicaraguan men's footballers
Dual internationalists (football)
A.D. Carmelita footballers
C.S. Cartaginés players
Belén F.C. players
L.D. Alajuelense footballers
Municipal Pérez Zeledón footballers
Santos de Guápiles footballers
Association football midfielders